The Wairongomai River or Wairongomai Stream is a river of the Taranaki Region of New Zealand's North Island. It is one of many small rivers and streams that radiate from the cone of Mount Taranaki, and reaches the North Taranaki Bight to the west of Ōkato.

See also
List of rivers of New Zealand

References

Rivers of Taranaki
Rivers of New Zealand